William Thomas, bardic name Islwyn (3 April 1832 – 20 November 1878), was a Welsh language poet and Christian clergyman. His best known poems were both called Yr Ystorm ['The Storm'], and were written in response to the sudden death of his fiancée.

Biography

William Thomas was born in Wales on 3 April 1832 to Morgan and Mary Thomas, near Ynysddu where Morgan was an agent to the Llanarth family.

Although his father was probably a Welsh speaker, his mother was probably an English-speaker and he was educated entirely in English. His fluency and love of Welsh came from the minister of their Calvinist Methodist chapel, Rev Daniel Jenkyns, who married his sister Mary and was greatly admired by the young poet.

Jenkyns also encouraged William towards ordination in the church, which annoyed Morgan who instead hoped that William would follow his brothers into the financially rewarding career in Mining Engineering following his elder brothers and for which he had received expensive private schooling in preparation in Newport, Tredegar and Cowbridge and finally completing his education at a well-known college in Swansea.

Whilst in Swansea, he became engaged to Ann Bowen.  Her death in 1853, at the age of twenty, became a source of poetic inspiration to him. He was a regular winner of local Eisteddfod prizes from the 1850s onwards, taking his bardic name from the mountain Mynyddislwyn, above his home.

His two best-known poems are both entitled "Y Storm" ("The Storm"), a long philosophic poem over 9,000 lines long. His poems are noted for their confident expressions of Christian faith, expectation of reunion in heaven, fulfilment of Christian duty and completion of a life fulfilled in God's work. He began preaching in 1854, and was ordained a Calvinistic Methodist minister in 1859 but never took charge of a chapel as was the custom with the Calvinist Methodists at the time. Daniel Jenkyns remained minister of Babell Chapel, Cwmfelinfach but Islwyn was a regular preacher there for more than 20 years in addition to his ongoing work.

In 1864 Thomas married Martha Davies, Ann Bowen's stepsister.  He edited several periodicals, the Welsh column of the Cardiff Times, South Wales Daily News and Gwladgarwr. His poetry, although not always greatly regarded in his own lifetime, found favour after his death and is now thought to be amongst the finest of the nineteenth century.

He also wrote twenty-nine poems in English.

He died from bronchitis in Ynysddu in 1878. He is buried in Babell Chapel, located in Cwmfelinfach.

Works
Barddoniaeth (1854) 
Caniadau (1867)
Ymweliad y Doethion a Bethlehem (1871)

References

Bibliography
Owen M. Edwards (ed.), Gwaith Barddonol Islwyn (Wrecsam, 1897) 
J.T. Jones (ed.), Detholiad o waith Islwyn (1932) 
T.H. Parry-Williams, Islwyn (1948) 
Meurig Walters (ed.), Y Storm (1980)
Meurig Walters, Islwyn: Man of the Mountain (1983)

External links
Islwyn Info and examples of his work
Gwent County History Association on Islwyn

1832 births
1878 deaths
Welsh-language poets
People from Ynysddu
People educated at Cowbridge Grammar School
British male poets
19th-century British poets
19th-century British male writers